Birowal is a village in Shaheed Bhagat Singh Nagar district of Punjab State, India. The village is administrated by Sarpanch an elected representative of the village.

Demography 
As of 2011, Birowal has a total number of 192 houses and population of 926 of which 468 include are males while 458 are females according to the report published by Census India in 2011. The literacy rate of Birowal is 78.25%, higher than the state average of 75.84%. The population of children under the age of 6 years is 80 which is 8.64% of total population of Birowal, and child sex ratio is approximately 1000 as compared to Punjab state average of 846.

Most of the people are from Schedule Caste which constitutes 41.90% of total population in Birowal. The town does not have any Schedule Tribe population so far.

As per the report published by Census India in 2011, 420 people were engaged in work activities out of the total population of Birowal which includes 275 males and 145 females. According to census survey report 2011, 52.62% workers describe their work as main work and 47.38% workers are involved in Marginal activity providing livelihood for less than 6 months.

Education 
The village has a Punjabi medium, co-ed upper primary school founded in 1976. The schools provide mid-day meal as per Indian Midday Meal Scheme and the meal prepared in school premises. As per Right of Children to Free and Compulsory Education Act the school provide free education to children between the ages of 6 and 14.

KC Engineering College and Doaba Khalsa Trust Group Of Institutions are the nearest colleges.

Transport 

See also 
List of villages in India

References

External links 
 Tourism of Punjab 
 Census of Punjab
 Locality Based PINCode

Villages in Shaheed Bhagat Singh Nagar district